Le Portier, sometimes referred to as Portier Cove or Mareterra, is a residential area under construction, expected for 2025, that will be part of the traditional Quartier of Monte Carlo in the Principality of Monaco. It will be the eleventh modern administrative Monégasque ward.

History
The project, started in early 2000s and scheduled for 2014, was abandoned in 2009 by the decision of the Prince Albert II due to the state of the national finances, but subsequently new funds were found and the project was restarted in 2011. In addition to the new residential area, it is also planned to build administrative buildings, museums and a theatre.

On July 18, 2019, the last interlocking concrete caisson was placed, closing the belt that delimits the offshore extension, thus specifically modifying the physical limits of Monaco. On the following December 16, the construction of the new six-hectare strip was completed.

By the year 2020, work had been completed to reclaim land from the sea in the Mediterranean, leaving the area available for the construction of previously announced projects.

Geography
It will border with the wards of Monte Carlo and Larvotto.

Special measures were taken to protect the environment, including the transfer of protected species in the area.

Gallery

See also
 Land reclamation in Monaco

References

External links
 Official website of the project Mareterra
 Le Portier (search on Monaco government website)

Quarters of Monaco
Land reclamation